Prisopus is a genus of stick insects belonging to the family Prisopodidae. These stick insects are present in Central and South America, India and Malesia.

Species
Species within this genus include:
 Prisopus amapa Piza, 1979
 Prisopus apteros Camousseight, 2010
 Prisopus ariadne Hebard, 1923
 Prisopus atrobrunneus (Heleodoro & Rafael, 2020)
 Prisopus berosus Westwood, 1859
 Prisopus bifidus Conle, Hennemann & Gutiérrez, 2011
 Prisopus biolleyi Carl, 1913
 Prisopus brunnescens (Heleodoro & Rafael, 2020)
 Prisopus caatingaensis (Heleodoro & Rafael, 2020)
 Prisopus cepus Westwood, 1859
 Prisopus clarus Conle, Hennemann, Bellanger, Lelong, Jourdan & Valero, 2020
 Prisopus conocephalus Conle, Hennemann, Bellanger, Lelong, Jourdan & Valero, 2020
 Prisopus draco (Olivier, 1792)
 Prisopus horridus (Gray, 1835)
 Prisopus horstokkii (Haan, 1842)
 Prisopus minimus Chopard, 1911
 Prisopus nanus Conle, Hennemann & Gutiérrez, 2011
 Prisopus occipitalis Dohrn, 1910
 Prisopus ohrtmanni (Lichtenstein, 1802)
 Prisopus phacellus Westwood, 1859
 Prisopus piperinus Redtenbacher, 1906
 Prisopus sacratus (Olivier, 1792)
 Prisopus villosipes (Redtenbacher, 1906)
 Prisopus wolfgangjunki Zompro, 2003

References

Phasmatodea genera
Taxa named by Amédée Louis Michel le Peletier
Taxa named by Jean Guillaume Audinet-Serville